Alfredo Cantu "Freddy" Gonzalez (May 23, 1946 – February 4, 1968) was a United States Marine Corps sergeant who posthumously received the Medal of Honor for service in the Battle of Huế during the Vietnam War.

Early years
Gonzalez, a Mexican-American, was born on May 23, 1946, in Edinburg, Texas, the only child of mother Dolia Gonzalez. He graduated from Lamar Grammar School in 1955, and from Edinburg High School in 1965. Despite his small size, weighing only , he was an All-District football player in high school.

He enlisted in the United States Marine Corps Reserve from San Antonio, Texas, on June 3, 1965, but was discharged and enlisted in the regular Marine Corps a month later, on July 6. He completed recruit training at Marine Corps Recruit Depot San Diego, California, the following September, and individual combat training at Camp Pendleton, California, that October.

He then became a rifleman with Headquarters and Service Company, 1st Reconnaissance Battalion, 1st Marine Division, and served in that capacity until January 1966. Promoted to private first class on January 1, he served a one-year tour of duty in Vietnam as a rifleman and squad leader with Company L, 3rd Battalion, 4th Marines, 3rd Marine Division. He was promoted to lance corporal on October 1 and to corporal on December 1 before his tour ended in February 1967. Upon his return to the United States, he saw duty as a rifleman with the 2nd Battalion, 6th Marines, 2nd Marine Division, at Camp Lejeune in North Carolina.

He became an instructor at Camp Lejeune, teaching Marines the techniques of guerrilla warfare, and expected to serve out the rest of the war in that capacity. His plans changed when he learned that an entire platoon, including men who had served under him during his tour, had been killed in an ambush in Vietnam. Gonzalez requested to be sent back for a second deployment. Ordered to the West Coast in May 1967, he joined the 3rd Replacement Company, Staging Battalion, at Camp Pendleton in California, for transfer to East Asia. On July 1, 1967, he was promoted to sergeant, and later that month arrived in the Republic of Vietnam. He served as a squad leader and platoon sergeant with the 3rd Platoon, Company A, 1st Battalion, 1st Marines, 1st Marine Division.

During the initial phase of the Battle of Huế in late January 1968, Gonzalez and his unit were sent by truck convoy to reinforce units in the city. When the convoy came under fire near the village of Lang Van Lrong on January 31, he led his men in clearing the area. Further down the road, he received shrapnel wounds while carrying an injured man to safety. When the convoy was halted by a machine gun bunker, he led his platoon towards the position and destroyed it with hand grenades. Eventually reaching the city of Huế, his unit became engaged in heavy combat there. Gonzalez was seriously wounded on February 3, but refused medical treatment. The next day, when a large North Vietnamese force inflicted heavy casualties on his company, he used anti-tank weapons to fire on the fortified positions. He successfully checked the North Vietnamese advance and silenced a rocket emplacement before being mortally wounded by a rocket. He took cover in the Saint Joan of Arc Catholic Church, where he died.

For his actions during the Battle of Huế from January 31 to February 4, 1968, Gonzalez was awarded the Medal of Honor. Vice President Spiro T. Agnew formally presented the medal to Gonzalez's mother on October 31, 1969, during a ceremony at the White House.

Medal of Honor citation

He is buried at Hillcrest Memorial Park in his hometown of Edinburg, Texas.

Honors

The United States Navy guided missile destroyer , commissioned in 1996, is named in his honor. His mother, Dolia, has an uncommonly close relationship with the ship and its crew. She attends many of the ship's major ceremonies, including departures and arrivals from deployments and changes of command. The crewmen exchange letters with Dolia Gonzalez, known as the ship's "mother," and call her during deployments.

The Alfredo Gonzalez Texas State Veterans Home in McAllen, Texas is named in his honor.

Two biographies by former Edinburg resident John W. Flores; "When The River Dreams: The Life of Marine Sgt. Freddy Gonzalez," printed in fall 2006, and "Marine Sgt. Freddy Gonzalez: Vietnam War Hero," scheduled for release by McFarland Publishing Company, in fall 2013.

The Museum of South Texas History holds a permanent display containing Gonzalez's uniform and medals. At The Basic School in Stafford County, Virginia, where Marine Corps officers are trained, there is an Alfredo Gonzalez Hall. In Edinburg, both an elementary school and a major east–west thoroughfare (Freddy Gonzalez Drive) are named in his honor.

Awards and decorations
Gonzalez's awards include:

See also

List of Medal of Honor recipients for the Vietnam War
List of Hispanic Medal of Honor recipients
Hispanics in the United States Marine Corps

References

1946 births
1968 deaths
American military personnel killed in the Vietnam War
Military personnel from Texas
Recipients of the Gallantry Cross (Vietnam)
Recipients of the Texas Legislative Medal of Honor
United States Marine Corps non-commissioned officers
United States Marine Corps Medal of Honor recipients
People from Edinburg, Texas
Vietnam War recipients of the Medal of Honor
United States Marine Corps personnel of the Vietnam War